ADF may refer to:

Science and technology
 ADF/Cofilin, a family of actin-binding proteins
 Alternate-day fasting, a variant of intermittent fasting
 Augmented Dickey–Fuller test, used in time series analysis

Computing
 Amiga Disk File, a file format
 Amsterdam Density Functional, electronic structure program
 Auto-lead Data Format, an XML-based standard for dealing in vehicles
 Automatic document feeder, in printers and scanners
 Oracle Application Development Framework

Organizations
 ADF Solutions, a US digital forensics company
 Alcohol and Drug Foundation, Australia
 Alliance Defending Freedom, a US conservative Christian organization
 Allied Democratic Forces, a Ugandan rebel group
 Arab Democracy Foundation, Qatar
 Arab Deterrent Force, serving in Lebanon
 Ár nDraíocht Féin, a Neopagan druid organization
 Australian Defence Force
 Army Deployment Force, Singapore counter-terrorist unit
 Design Factory, also known as Aalto Design Factory, a department of Aalto University

Transportation
 Aircraft deicing fluid
 Automatic direction finder, a navigation instrument
 Dexter B. Florence Memorial Field (FAA code), an airport in the US
 Adıyaman Airport (IATA code), an airport in Turkey
 Anyang East railway station, China Railway telegraph code ADF

Other uses
 Aerospace Data Facilities of the US National Reconnaissance Office
 Alternative display facility, a type of financial exchange
 American Dance Festival, US
 Dhofari Arabic (ISO 639-3 code), Oman
 Asian Dub Foundation, a British band
 Advanced Dominance Fighter, a fictional aircraft in the Ace Combat video games